The 1978 Daily Mirror Champion of Champions was a professional non-ranking snooker tournament held on Thursday 2 and Friday 3 November 1978 at the Wembley Conference Centre in London, England.

Summary
Four players contested the tournament which was held over two days. The event was promoted by Michael Barrett, a boxing promoter.

Ray Reardon easily won the first semi-final 6–1 after taking a 5–0 lead. In the evening match Doug Mountjoy led 3–2 but Alex Higgins won the next four frames to win 6–3. The 8th frame was won on a respotted black. In the final Reardon led Higgins 6–4 after the afternoon session. In the evening Reardon extended his lead to 9–5 before Higgins won the next four frames to level the match. In the 19th frame Reardon had a 77 clearance to win the frame and then won the 20th frame easily to win the match.

Brief highlights were shown on ITV's World of Sport on the following afternoon (Saturday 4 November, 3:10pm).

Prize fund
The breakdown of prize money for this year is shown below:
Winner: £2,000
Runner-up: £1,000
Semi-finals: £500
Total: £4,000

There was a £100 prize for every century break.

Players
The following 4 players qualified for the tournament:

Main draw

Final

Century breaks
None. The highest break: 94  Alex Higgins

References

1978
1978 in snooker
1978 in English sport
1978 sports events in London
November 1978 sports events in the United Kingdom
International sports competitions in London